The universal relation assumption in relational databases states, that one can place all data attributes into a (possibly very wide) table, which may then be decomposed into smaller tables as needed.

However, the assumption that a single large table can capture real database designs is often plagued with a number of difficulties. The "nested universal relation" model has attempted to address some of the problems and offer improvements.

References

External links 
 Who won the Universal Relation wars? by Alberto Mendelzon

Database theory